Corinne Buie (born March 7, 1992) is an American ice hockey forward, currently playing for the Minnesota Whitecaps in the NWHL. She has won the Clarkson Cup once and the Isobel Cup twice.

Career 
As a high school player, she was a finalist for the 2010 Minnesota Ms. Hockey Award. Buie put up 100 points in 128 NCAA games with Providence.

After graduating, Buie signed with the Boston Blades of the CWHL, with who she would win the Clarkson Cup in 2015.

After just one season with the Pride, she signed with the Buffalo Beauts. The team would win the Isobel Cup in her first season, marking her third straight season winning a professional championship. For the 2017–18 season, she served as the Beauts' captain. She has played in the 2017, 2018, and 2020 NWHL All-Star games.

In August 2020, Buie returned to her home state to sign with the Minnesota Whitecaps, becoming just the second player in NWHL history to play for three different teams. She chose to opt-out of the 2020-21 COVID-19 bubble season, however.

Career stats

Awards and honors
2015 Clarkson Cup champion

NWHL
Participant, 2nd NWHL All-Star Game
Isobel Cup champion: 2015, 2016

References

External links
 

Buffalo Beauts players
Minnesota Whitecaps players
1992 births
Living people
People from Edina, Minnesota
Ice hockey players from Minnesota
American women's ice hockey forwards
Clarkson Cup champions
Isobel Cup champions
Boston Blades players
Boston Pride players
Providence Friars women's ice hockey players